María del Pilar Pellicer López de Llergo (12 February 1938 – 16 May 2020) was a Mexican actress. At the 17th Ariel Awards, she won the Ariel Award for Best Actress for her performance in the film La Choca (1974).

Biography
Pilar was daughter of lawyer César Pellicer Sánchez and wife María del Pilar López de Llergo, both from Tabasco.

At age 18, Pilar studied at the Academy of Contemporary Dance, and was trained by Seki Sano. Pilar later abandoned dance to study philosophy at the National Autonomous University of Mexico. She also studied at the Instituto Nacional de Bellas Artes y Literatura. She debuted as an actress in the movie El vendedor de muñecas in 1955.

Death
Pellicer died from COVID-19 on 16 May 2020, at age 82, during the COVID-19 pandemic in Mexico.

Selected filmography 

 El vendedor de muñecas (1955)
 The Life of Agustín Lara (1959) - Admiradora joven
 Nazarín (1959) - Lucía (uncredited)
 Escuela de verano (1959) - Magdalena Dávila
 La Fièvre Monte à El Pao (1959) - Pilar Cárdenas (uncredited)
 Quinceañera (1960) - Olivia
 El gángster (1965) - (uncredited)
 Tajimara (1965) - Cecilia
 Pedro Páramo (1967) - Susana San Juan
 The Bandits (1967) - (uncredited)
 Day of the Evil Gun (1968) - Lydia Yearby
 Las visitaciones del diablo (1968) - Paloma
 Los amigos (1968)
 Santa (1969)
 La trinchera (1969)
 ¿Porque nací mujer? (1970) - Josefa
 El mundo del los muertos (1970) - Doña Damiana Velazquez / Alicia
 Siempre hay una primera vez (1971) - (segment "Isabel")
 Una mujer honesta (1972)
 Los perturbados (1972) - (segment "La Búsqueda)
 Manuel Saldivar, el texano (1972)
 El Festín de la Loba (1972) - Gloria
 La Choca (1974) - La Choca
 Las Poquianchis (1976) - Santa
 Balún Canán (1977) - Matilde
 El mexicano (1977)
 Los amantes frios (1978) - Jacinta (segment "El difunto al pozo y la viuda al gozo")
 Las del talon (1978)
Tres mujeres en la hoguera (1979) - Mané
 Cadena perpetua (1979) - Mujer de Pantoja
 Las golfas del talón (1979)
 Rigo es amor (1980) - La Tulipana
 Con la muerte en ancas (1980) - Madre de Casey
 Zorro, the Gay Blade (1981) - Don Francisco's Wife
 Las Siete Cucas (1981)
 Showdown at Eagle Gap (1982) - Señora Romero
 Dulce espiritu (1986)
 Amor a la vuelta de la esquina (1986)
 Un asesino anda suelto (1991)
 Marea suave (1992)
 Playa azul (1992) - Señora
 El ocaso del cazador (2017) - (final film role)

TV
 El Camino Secreto (1986–1987) - Yolanda
 Muchachitas (1991) - Martha Sánchez-Zúñiga de Cantú
 Huracán (1997–1998) - Ada Vargas Lugo
 Primer amor... a mil por hora (2000–2001) - La Chonta
 Sin pecado concebido (2001) - Loló de la Barcena
 La Madrastra (2005) - Sonia
 Mujeres Asesinas 3 (2010, Episode: "Las Cotuchas, empresarias") - Amparo Quezada
 Triunfo del Amor (2010–2011) - Eva Grez
 Como dice el dicho (2012–2013) - Dalia / Gertrudis
 La Gata (2014) - Doña Rita Olea Pérez

References

Bibliography

External links

1938 births
2020 deaths
Ariel Award winners
Mexican telenovela actresses
Mexican television actresses
Mexican film actresses
Actresses from Mexico City
20th-century Mexican actresses
21st-century Mexican actresses
People from Mexico City
National Autonomous University of Mexico alumni
Deaths from the COVID-19 pandemic in Mexico